The 2009 Hokkaido Nippon-Ham Fighters season was the 64th season for the Hokkaido Nippon-Ham Fighters franchise.

Regular season

Standings

Record vs. opponents

Game log

|-align="center" bgcolor="#ffbbbb"
| 1 || April 3 || Eagles || 3–1 || Iwakuma (1–0) || Darvish (0–1) || Arime (1) || 42,328 || 0–1–0
|-align="center" bgcolor="#ffbbbb"
| 2 || April 4 || Eagles || 6–5 || Gwyn (1–0) || Fujii (0–1) || Kawagishi (1) || 36,316 || 0–2–0
|-align="center" bgcolor="#ffbbbb"
| 3 || April 5 || Eagles || 9–6 (11) || Kawagishi (1–0) || Sakamoto (0–1) ||  || 34,252 || 0–3–0
|-align="center" bgcolor="bbffbb"
| 4 || April 7 || Marines || 1–9 || Tadano (1–0) || Karakawa (0–1) ||  || 17,568 || 1–3–0
|-align="center" bgcolor="bbffbb"
| 5 || April 8 || Marines || 7–8 || Tateyama (1–0) || Sikorski (1–1) || H. Takeda (1) || 18,853 || 2–3–0
|-align="center" bgcolor="bbffbb"
| 6 || April 10 || @ Hawks || 9–1 || Darvish (1–1) || Wada (1–1) ||  || 26,940 || 3–3–0
|-align="center" bgcolor="bbffbb"
| 7 || April 11 || @ Hawks || 9–0 || Fujii (1–1) || Takahashi (0–1) ||  || 28,306 || 4–3–0
|-align="center" bgcolor="#ffbbbb"
| 8 || April 12 || @ Hawks || 4–5 || Sugiuchi (1–0) || Sweeney (0–1) || Mahara (1) || 28,296 || 4–4–0
|-align="center" bgcolor="#ffbbbb"
| 9 || April 14 || Buffaloes || 8–7 || Kaneko (1–1) || Tadano (1–1) || Kato (4) || 17,548 || 4–5–0
|-align="center" bgcolor="bbffbb"
| 10 || April 15 || Buffaloes || 5–11 || Kikuchi (1–0) || Motoyanagi (0–1) ||  || 17,579 || 5–5–0
|-align="center" bgcolor="bbffbb"
| 11 || April 16 || Buffaloes || 1–7 || M. Takeda (1–0) || Nakayama (0–1) ||  || 20,702 || 6–5–0
|- align="center" bgcolor="bbffbb"
| 12 || April 17 || @ Lions || 4–2 || Darvish (2–1) || Wakui (2–1) || H. Takeda (2) || 15,181 || 7–5–0
|- align="center" bgcolor="bbffbb"
| 13 || April 18 || @ Lions || 6–4 || Tanimoto (1–0) || Shotsu (0–1) || H. Takeda (3) || 28,525 || 8–5–0
|- align="center" bgcolor="bbffbb"
| 14 || April 19 || @ Lions || 8–6 || Miyanishi (1–0) || Onodera (1–1) || H. Takeda (4) || 22,315 || 9–5–0
|-align="center" bgcolor="#ffbbbb"
| 15 || April 21 || Hawks || 10–5 || Kamiuchi (2–0) || Tadano (1–2) ||  || 17,486 || 9–6–0
|-align="center" bgcolor="#ffbbbb"
| 16 || April 22 || Hawks || 3–2 || Houlton (2–0) || Tateyama (1–1) || Mahara (3) || 19,138 || 9–7–0
|-align="center" bgcolor="bbffbb"
| 17 || April 23 || Hawks || 6–7 || Miyanishi (2–0) || Settsu (0–2) ||  || 18,364 || 10–7–0
|-align="center" bgcolor="bbffbb"
| 18 || April 24 || @ Buffaloes || 11–0 || Darvish (3–1) || Komatsu (0–2) ||  || 18,724 || 11–7–0
|-align="center" bgcolor="#bbbbbb"
| — || April 25 || @ Buffaloes || colspan=6|Game postponed due to rain
|-align="center" bgcolor="#ffbbbb"
| 19 || April 26 || @ Buffaloes || 3–11 || Kishida (3–0) || Sakakibara (0–1) ||  || 13,223 || 11–8–0
|-align="center" bgcolor="bbffbb"
| 20 || April 28 || @ Eagles || 4–2 || Yagi (1–0) || Kawai (0–1) || H. Takeda (5) || 13,326 || 12–8–0
|-align="center" bgcolor="#ffbbbb"
| 21 || April 29 || @ Eagles || 1–2 || Tanaka (4–0) || M. Takeda (1–1) ||  || 20,381 || 12–9–0
|-align="center" bgcolor="#ffbbbb"
| 22 || April 30 || @ Eagles || 2–4 || Hasebe (1–2) || Sweeney (0–2) || Arime (2) || 11,239 || 12–10–0
|-

|-align="center" bgcolor="#ffbbbb"
| 23 || May 1 || Lions || 2–1 (12) || Onuma (1–1) || Tateyama (1–2) || Nogami (1) || 28,007 || 12–11–0
|-align="center" bgcolor="bbffbb"
| 24 || May 2 || Lions || 6–7 (11) || H. Takeda (1–0) || Nogami (0–1) ||  || 34,711 || 13–11–0
|-align="center" bgcolor="bbffbb"
| 25 || May 3 || Lions || 5–6 (12) || Tanimoto (2–0) || Onodera (1–2) ||  || 40,754 || 14–11–0
|-align="center" bgcolor="bbffbb"
| 26 || May 4 || @ Marines || 10–7 || Tadano (2–2) || Omine (1–1) || H. Takeda (6) || 30,058 || 15–11–0
|-align="center" bgcolor="bbffbb"
| 27 || May 5 || @ Marines || 2–0 (5) || Yagi (2–0) || Kobayashi (0–3) ||  || 22,726 || 16–11–0
|-align="center" bgcolor="#ffbbbb"
| 28 || May 6 || @ Marines || 3–7 || Watanabe (1–3) || Sweeney (0–3) ||  || 23,139 || 16–12–0
|-align="center" bgcolor="bbffbb"
| 29 || May 8 || Buffaloes || 1–10 || Darvish (4–1) || Nakayama (0–3) ||  || 26,638 || 17–12–0
|-align="center" bgcolor="bbffbb"
| 30 || May 9 || Buffaloes || 2–3 || Fujii (2–1) || Komatsu (0–4) || H. Takeda (7) || 26,308 || 18–12–0
|-align="center" bgcolor="bbffbb"
| 31 || May 10 || Buffaloes || 2–7 || M. Takeda (2–1) || Yoshino (0–1) ||  || 28,156 || 19–12–0
|-align="center" bgcolor="bbffbb"
| 32 || May 12 || @ Eagles || 8–1 || Yagi (3–0) || Isaka (1–1) ||  || 10,231 || 20–12–0
|-align="center" bgcolor="#ffbbbb"
| 33 || May 13 || @ Eagles || 3–7 || Tanaka (5–0) || Sakamoto (0–2) ||  || 13,983 || 20–13–0
|-align="center" bgcolor="bbffbb"
| 34 || May 14 || @ Eagles || 7–0 || Sweeney (1–3) || Hasebe (2–3) ||  || 10,677 || 21–13–0
|-align="center" bgcolor="bbffbb"
| 35 || May 15 || @ Buffaloes || 4–2 || Darvish (5–1) || Nakayama (0–4) || H. Takeda (8) || 11,405 || 22–13–0
|-align="center" bgcolor="bbffbb"
| 36 || May 16 || @ Buffaloes || 7–3 || Fujii (3–1) || Komatsu (0–5) || H. Takeda (9) || 21,965 || 23–13–0
|-align="center" bgcolor="#ffbbbb"
| 37 || May 17 || @ Buffaloes || 0–6 || Mitsuhara (1–0) || M. Takeda (2–2) ||  || 19,467 || 23–14–0
|-align="center" bgcolor="bbffbb"
| 38 || May 19 || Giants || 6–16 || Yagi (4–0) || Takahashi (2–1) ||  || 33,050 || 24–14–0
|-align="center" bgcolor="bbffbb"
| 39 || May 20 || Giants || 5–6 || Hayashi (1–0) || Greisinger (5–3) || H. Takeda (10) || 33,602 || 25–14–0
|-align="center" bgcolor="#ffbbbb"
| 40 || May 22 || Swallows || 3–2 || Tateyama (5–0) || Fujii (3–2) || Lim (14) || 20,932 || 25–15–0
|-align="center" bgcolor="bbffbb"
| 41 || May 23 || Swallows || 0–3 || Darvish (6–1) || Barrett (0–1) ||  || 31,288 || 26–15–0
|-align="center" bgcolor="#ffbbbb"
| 42 || May 24 || @ Dragons || 0–1 || Kawai (3–0) || M. Takeda (2–3) || Iwase (11) || 31,711 || 26–16–0
|-align="center" bgcolor="#ffbbbb"
| 43 || May 25 || @ Dragons || 4–10 || Asakura (5–2) || Itokazu (0–1) ||  || 29,051 || 26–17–0
|-align="center" bgcolor="#ffbbbb"
| 44 || May 27 || @ BayStars || 4–5 || Kizuka (1–0) || Kikuchi (1–1) || Yamaguchi (3) || 13,062 || 26–18–0
|-align="center" bgcolor="#bbbbbb"
| — || May 28 || @ BayStars || colspan=6|Game postponed due to rain
|-align="center" bgcolor="bbffbb"
| 45 || May 29 || @ BayStars || 7–1 || Fujii (4–2) || Miura (5–3) ||  || 7,349 || 27–18–0
|-align="center" bgcolor="bbffbb"
| 46 || May 30 || Tigers || 2–8 || Darvish (7–1) || Fukuhara (2–4) ||  || 42,328 || 28–18–0
|-align="center" bgcolor="ffeeaa"
| 47 || May 31 || Tigers || 4–4 (12) || colspan=3|Game tied after 12 innings || 42,051 || 28–18–1
|-

|-align="center" bgcolor="ffbbbb"
| 48 || June 2 || Carp || 2–1 || Maeda (4–5) || Itokazu (0–2) || Nagakawa (17) || 20,252 || 28–19–1
|-align="center" bgcolor="bbffbb"
| 49 || June 3 || Carp || 2–7 || Tateyama (2–2) || Yokoyama (1–3) ||  || 22,257 || 29–19–1
|-align="center" bgcolor="ffbbbb"
| 50 || June 5 || @ Giants || 2–5 || Gonzalez (6–0) || Fujii (4–3) || Kroon (9) || 44,242 || 29–20–1
|-align="center" bgcolor="ffbbbb"
| 51 || June 6 || @ Giants || 2–3 || Utsumi (2–3) || Darvish (7–2) || Kroon (10) || 44,887 || 29–21–1
|-align="center" bgcolor="bbffbb"
| 52 || June 7 || @ Swallows || 3–0 || M. Takeda (3–3) || Kawashima (4–4) || H. Takeda (11) || 20,032 || 30–21–1
|-align="center" bgcolor="ffbbbb"
| 53 || June 8 || @ Swallows || 3–4 || Lim (1–0) || Tateyama (2–3) ||  || 12,515 || 30–22–1
|-align="center" bgcolor="bbffbb"
| 54 || June 10 || BayStars || 3–5 || Miyanishi (3–0) || Walrond (3–5) || H. Takeda (12) || 10,977 || 31–22–1
|-align="center" bgcolor="bbffbb"
| 55 || June 11 || BayStars || 3–9 || Sweeney (2–3) || Oyamada (0–1) ||  || 22,582 || 32–22–1
|-align="center" bgcolor="bbffbb"
| 56 || June 13 || Dragons || 1–9 || Darvish (8–2) || Yamamoto (0–2) ||  || 35,699 || 33–22–1
|-align="center" bgcolor="ffbbbb"
| 57 || June 14 || Dragons || 11–10 || Kawai (5–0) || Itokazu (0–3) || Iwase (15) || 33,086 || 33–23–1
|-align="center" bgcolor="ffbbbb"
| 58 || June 16 || @ Tigers || 3–4 || Kubo (2–4) || M. Takeda (3–4) || Fujikawa (6) || 21,310 || 33–24–1
|-align="center" bgcolor="bbffbb"
| 59 || June 17 || @ Tigers || 10–5 || Yagi (5–0) || Shimoyanagi (5–4) ||  || 23,543 || 34–24–1
|-align="center" bgcolor="bbffbb"
| 60 || June 20 || @ Carp || 5–1 || Darvish (9–2) || Saito (4–5) ||  || 30,993 || 35–24–1
|-align="center" bgcolor="ffbbbb"
| 61 || June 21 || @ Carp || 5–7 || Maeda (5–5) || M. Takeda (3–5) || Nagakawa (20) || 30,486 || 35–25–1
|-align="center" bgcolor="bbffbb"
| 62 || June 26 || @ Marines || 5–0 || Darvish (10–2) || Kobayashi (1–5) ||  || 28,367 || 36–25–1
|-align="center" bgcolor="bbffbb"
| 63 || June 27 || @ Marines || 5–4 || Yagi (6–0) || Karakawa (4–4) || H. Takeda (13) || 23,513 || 37–25–1
|-align="center" bgcolor="ffbbbb"
| 64 || June 28 || @ Marines || 2–3 (7) || Ono (4–4) || Sweeney (2–4) ||  || 18,184 || 37–26–1
|-align="center" bgcolor="bbffbb"
| 65 || June 30 || Eagles || 1–3 || Itokazu (1–3) || Hasebe (4–6) || H. Takeda (14) || 23,248 || 38–26–1
|-

|-align="center" bgcolor="bbffbb"
| 66 || July 1 || Eagles || 5–10 || M. Takeda (4–5) || Fujiwara (0–2) ||  || 23,374 || 39–26–1
|-align="center" bgcolor="bbffbb"
| 67 || July 2 || Eagles || 3–6 || Hayashi (2–0) || Arime (0–1) || H. Takeda (15) || 25,442 || 40–26–1
|-align="center" bgcolor="ffbbbb"
| 68 || July 4 || Hawks || 7–3 || Sugiuchi (9–1) || Yagi (6–1) ||  || 18,086 || 40–27–1
|-align="center" bgcolor="ffbbbb"
| 69 || July 5 || Hawks || 3–2 || Houlton (6–3) || Sweeney (2–5) || Mahara (14) || 18,660 || 40–28–1
|-align="center" bgcolor="ffbbbb"
| 70 || July 7 || @ Lions || 4–6 || Kishi (9–1) || Itokazu (1–4) ||  || 12,525 || 40–29–1
|-align="center" bgcolor="ffbbbb"
| 71 || July 8 || @ Lions || 3–4 || Iwasaki (2–0) || Darvish (10–3) || Onodera (10) || 12,525 || 40–30–1
|-align="center" bgcolor="ffbbbb"
| 72 || July 9 || @ Lions || 2–8 || Wakui (10–3) || M. Takeda (4–6) ||  || 12,625 || 40–31–1
|-align="center" bgcolor="bbffbb"
| 73 || July 10 || Marines || 0–4 || Tadano (3–2) || Kobayashi (1–7) ||  || 25,690 || 41–31–1
|-align="center" bgcolor="bbffbb"
| 74 || July 11 || Marines || 5–6 || Ejiri (1–0) || Kawasaki (1–1) || H. Takeda (16) || 37,116 || 42–31–1
|-align="center" bgcolor="bbffbb"
| 75 || July 12 || Marines || 6–7 (12) || Miyanishi (4–0) || Ito (2–2) ||  || 34,764 || 43–31–1
|-align="center" bgcolor="ffbbbb"
| 76 || July 14 || @ Hawks || 1–2 || Otonari (4–4) || Fujii (4–4) || Mahara (16) || 31,262 || 43–32–1
|-align="center" bgcolor="bbffbb"
| 77 || July 15 || @ Hawks || 9–1 || Darvish (11–3) || Fujioka (3–4) ||  || 33,031 || 44–32–1
|-align="center" bgcolor="bbffbb"
| 78 || July 16 || @ Hawks || 3–2 || Kikuchi (2–1) || Sugiuchi (9–2) || H. Takeda (17) || 33,549 || 45–32–1
|-align="center" bgcolor="#bbbbbb"
| — || July 18 || Lions || colspan=6|Game postponed due to rain
|-align="center" bgcolor="#bbbbbb"
| — || July 19 || Lions || colspan=6|Game postponed due to rain
|-align="center" bgcolor="bbffbb"
| 79 || July 20 || Marines || 3–4 || Fujii (5–4) || Omine (2–5) || H. Takeda (18) || 22,004 || 46–32–1
|-align="center" bgcolor="bbffbb"
| 80 || July 21 || Marines || 3–7 || Tadano (4–2) || Matsumoto (0–1) ||  || 18,742 || 47–32–1
|-align="center" bgcolor="bbffbb"
| 81 || July 22 || Marines || 1–2 || Darvish (12–3) || Naruse (4–5) ||  || 23,547 || 48–32–1
|- align="center"
|colspan="9" bgcolor="#bbffff"|All-Star Break: CL and PL split series, 1–1
|-align="center" bgcolor="bbffbb"
| 82 || July 28 || @ Marines || 5–1 || Yagi (7–1) || Kobayashi (2–8) ||  || 24,558 || 49–32–1
|-align="center" bgcolor="bbffbb"
| 83 || July 29 || @ Marines || 6–5 || Ejiri (2–0) || Sikorski (5–5) || H. Takeda (19) || 17,878 || 50–32–1
|-align="center" bgcolor="bbffbb"
| 84 || July 30 || @ Marines || 7–6 || Miyanishi (5–0) || Ogino (2–2) || H. Takeda (20) || 15,137 || 51–32–1
|-align="center" bgcolor="bbffbb"
| 85 || July 31 || Hawks || 1–5 || Darvish (13–3) || Germano (4–2) ||  || 29,525 || 52–32–1
|-

|-align="center" bgcolor="ffbbbb"
| 86 || August 1 || Hawks || 2–1 || Houlton (8–4) || Tateyama (2–4) || Mahara (21) || 33,543 || 52–33–1
|-align="center" bgcolor="bbffbb"
| 87 || August 2 || Hawks || 1–7 || M. Takeda (5–6) || Sugiuchi (9–3) ||  || 35,639 || 53–33–1
|-align="center" bgcolor="bbffbb"
| 88 || August 4 || @ Lions || 5–1 || Yagi (8–1) || Wakui (12–4) ||  || 20,473 || 54–33–1
|-align="center" bgcolor="ffbbbb"
| 89 || August 5 || @ Lions || 2–5 || Ishii (5–7) || Kikuchi (2–2) || Onodera (16) || 18,510 || 54–34–1
|-align="center" bgcolor="bbffbb"
| 90 || August 6 || @ Lions || 7–4 || Tateyama (3–4) || Iwasaki (2–4) || H. Takeda (21) || 19,360 || 55–34–1
|-align="center" bgcolor="ffbbbb"
| 91 || August 7 || @ Eagles || 1–3 || Tanaka (9–4) || Darvish (13–4) || Gwyn (4) || 20,226 || 55–35–1
|-align="center" bgcolor="bbffbb"
| 92 || August 8 || @ Eagles || 8–6 || Fujii (6–4) || Nagai (7–5) || H. Takeda (22) || 20,542 || 56–35–1
|-align="center" bgcolor="bbffbb"
| 93 || August 9 || @ Eagles || 4–1 || M. Takeda (6–6) || Hasebe (4–6) || H. Takeda (23) || 16,077 || 57–35–1
|-align="center" bgcolor="bbffbb"
| 94 || August 11 || Buffaloes || 3–4 (12) || Hayashi (3–0) || Okubo (2–1) ||  || 20,013 || 58–35–1
|-align="center" bgcolor="ffbbbb"
| 95 || August 12 || Buffaloes || 8–2 || Kondo (6–7) || Sunaga (2–1) ||  || 21,884 || 58–36–1
|-align="center" bgcolor="bbffbb"
| 96 || August 13 || Buffaloes || 4–8 || Sweeney (3–5) || Hirano (2–8) ||  || 33,823 || 59–36–1
|-align="center" bgcolor="bbffbb"
| 97 || August 14 || Lions || 2–3 || Darvish (14–4) || Onuma (2–4) || H. Takeda (24) || 34,095 || 60–36–1
|-align="center" bgcolor="bbffbb"
| 98 || August 15 || Lions || 0–2 || Kikuchi (3–2) || Kishi (11–2) || H. Takeda (25) || 33,567 || 61–36–1
|-align="center" bgcolor="bbffbb"
| 99 || August 16 || Lions || 6–7 (10) || Miyanishi (6–0) || Onodera (2–5) ||  || 30,399 || 62–36–1
|-align="center" bgcolor="ffbbbb"
| 100 || August 18 || Eagles || 6–3 || Iwakuma (10–5) || Yagi (8–2) ||  || 15,105 || 62–37–1
|-align="center" bgcolor="#bbbbbb"
| — || August 19 || Eagles || colspan=6|Game postponed due to rain
|-align="center" bgcolor="ffbbbb"
| 101 || August 20 || Eagles || 4–1 || Nagai (8–6) || Tadano (4–3) || Fukumori (3) || 24,010 || 62–38–1
|-align="center" bgcolor="ffbbbb"
| 102 || August 21 || @ Hawks || 2–6 || Otonari (6–7) || Darvish (14–5) ||  || 34,374 || 62–39–1
|-align="center" bgcolor="ffbbbb"
| 103 || August 22 || @ Hawks || 3–4 || Houlton (9–6) || Ejiri (2–1) || Mahara (26) || 32,511 || 62–40–1
|-align="center" bgcolor="ffbbbb"
| 104 || August 23 || @ Hawks || 1–3 || Sugiuchi (12–3) || M. Takeda (6–7) ||  || 33,648 || 62–41–1
|-align="center" bgcolor="ffbbbb"
| 105 || August 25 || @ Buffaloes || 10–11 (10) || Shimizu (1–2) || Tateyama (3–5) ||  || 12,381 || 62–42–1
|-align="center" bgcolor="bbffbb"
| 106 || August 26 || @ Buffaloes || 6–2 || Itokazu (2–4) || Kondo (7–8) ||  || 20,360 || 63–42–1
|-align="center" bgcolor="bbffbb"
| 107 || August 27 || @ Buffaloes || 3–1 || Tadano (5–3) || Hirano (2–10) || H. Takeda (26) || 9,412 || 64–42–1
|-align="center" bgcolor="bbffbb"
| 108 || August 28 || Hawks || 1–3 || Miyanishi (7–0) || Otonari (6–8) || H. Takeda (27) || 23,402 || 65–42–1
|-align="center" bgcolor="bbffbb"
| 109 || August 29 || Hawks || 3–5 || Kikuchi (4–2) || Mise (0–1) || H. Takeda (28) || 29,648 || 66–42–1
|-align="center" bgcolor="ffbbbb"
| 110 || August 30 || Hawks || 3–2 || Sugiuchi (13–3) || Miyanishi (7–1) || Mahara (27) || 28,483 || 66–43–1
|-

|-align="center" bgcolor="ffbbbb"
| 111 || September 1 || @ Marines || 2–9 || Omine (4–5) || Itokazu (2–5) ||  || 10,134 || 66–44–1
|-align="center" bgcolor="bbffbb"
| 112 || September 2 || @ Marines || 3–1 || Sweeney (4–5) || Kobayashi (3–12) || H. Takeda (29) || 16,542 || 67–44–1
|-align="center" bgcolor="ffbbbb"
| 113 || September 3 || @ Marines || 1–7 || Naruse (8–5) || Tadano (5–4) ||  || 10,167 || 67–45–1
|-align="center" bgcolor="bbffbb"
| 114 || September 4 || @ Eagles || 9–2 || Kikuchi (5–2) || Kawagishi (2–3) ||  || 13,930 || 68–45–1
|-align="center" bgcolor="bbffbb"
| 115 || September 5 || @ Eagles || 10–3 || M. Takeda (7–7) || Aoyama (1–4) ||  || 19,781 || 69–45–1
|-align="center" bgcolor="ffbbbb"
| 116 || September 6 || @ Eagles || 3–4 || Fukumori (6–0) || Tateyama (3–6) ||  || 19,533 || 69–46–1
|-align="center" bgcolor="ffbbbb"
| 117 || September 8 || @ Lions || 0–5 || Wakui (14–5) || Sweeney (4–6) ||  || 15,346 || 69–47–1
|-align="center" bgcolor="ffbbbb"
| 118 || September 9 || @ Lions || 4–7 || Ishii (8–8) || Tadano (5–5) || Bayliss (1) || 14,018 || 69–48–1
|-align="center" bgcolor="ffbbbb"
| 119 || September 10 || @ Lions || 4–5 || Fujita (2–0) || Tateyama (3–7) || Matsunaga (1) || 15,160 || 69–49–1
|-align="center" bgcolor="ffbbbb"
| 120 || September 11 || Marines || 3–2 || Shimizu (5–6) || Fujii (6–5) || Sikorski (11) || 29,449 || 69–50–1
|-align="center" bgcolor="ffbbbb"
| 121 || September 12 || Marines || 4–2 || Karakawa (5–6) || Yagi (8–3) || Sikorski (12) || 38,307 || 69–51–1
|-align="center" bgcolor="bbffbb"
| 122 || September 13 || Marines || 1–3 || Darvish (15–5) || Ono (7–7) || H. Takeda (30) || 42,069 || 70–51–1
|-align="center" bgcolor="bbffbb"
| 123 || September 15 || Eagles || 2–5 || M. Takeda (8–7) || Iwakuma (12–6) || H. Takeda (31) || 20,351 || 71–51–1
|-align="center" bgcolor="ffbbbb"
| 124 || September 16 || Eagles || 7–3 || Nagai (11–6) || Sweeney (4–7) ||  || 20,446 || 71–52–1
|-align="center" bgcolor="bbffbb"
| 125 || September 17 || Eagles || 7–3 || Tateyama (4–7) || Satake (0–1) || H. Takeda (32) || 21,636 || 72–52–1
|-align="center" bgcolor="bbffbb"
| 126 || September 18 || @ Buffaloes || 7–6 (11) || H. Takeda (2–0) || Kaneko (11–8) ||  || 13,684 || 73–52–1
|-align="center" bgcolor="bbffbb"
| 127 || September 19 || @ Buffaloes || 4–1 || Itokazu (3–5) || Hirano (3–11) ||  || 18,914 || 74–52–1
|-align="center" bgcolor="ffbbbb"
| 128 || September 20 || @ Buffaloes || 2–7 || Vogelsong (1–4) || Miyanishi (7–2) ||  || 24,208 || 74–53–1
|-align="center" bgcolor="ffbbbb"
| 129 || September 21 || Lions || 5–3 || Wakui (15–5) || M. Takeda (8–8) ||  || 38,165 || 74–54–1
|-align="center" bgcolor="ffbbbb"
| 130 || September 22 || Lions || 5–2 || Hsu (1–1) || Sweeney (4–8) ||  || 34,214 || 74–55–1
|-align="center" bgcolor="ffbbbb"
| 131 || September 23 || Lions || 6–1 || Nishiguchi (4–3) || Yoshikawa (0–1) ||  || 26,955 || 74–56–1
|-align="center" bgcolor="ffeeaa"
| 132 || September 25 || @ Hawks || 0–0 (12) || colspan=3|Game tied after 12 innings || 31,278 || 74–56–2
|-align="center" bgcolor="bbffbb"
| 133 || September 26 || @ Hawks || 5–4 (12) || H. Takeda (3–0) || Fujioka (5–8) ||  || 32,312 || 75–56–2
|-align="center" bgcolor="ffbbbb"
| 134 || September 27 || @ Hawks || 2–4 || Otonari (8–9) || M. Takeda (8–9) || Mahara (29) || 33,300 || 75–57–2
|-align="center" bgcolor="bbffbb"
| 135 || September 29 || Buffaloes || 3–12 || Sweeney (5–8) || Ihara (0–3) ||  || 19,576 || 76–57–2
|-align="center" bgcolor="bbffbb"
| 136 || September 30 || Buffaloes || 2–3 || Itokazu (4–5) || Kondo (8–12) || H. Takeda (33) || 17,352 || 77–57–2
|-

|-align="center" bgcolor="ffbbbb"
| 137 || October 1 || Buffaloes || 6–5 || Kishida (9–4) || Hayashi (3–1) || Kaneko (3) || 19,784 || 77–58–2
|-align="center" bgcolor="bbffbb"
| 138 || October 3 || Marines || 1–11 || Yagi (9–3) || Omine (5–6) ||  || 34,228 || 78–58–2
|-align="center" bgcolor="bbffbb"
| 139 || October 4 || Hawks || 2–4 || M. Takeda (9–9) || Otonari (8–10) || H. Takeda (34) || 41,698 || 79–58–2
|-align="center" bgcolor="ffbbbb"
| 140 || October 5 || Lions || 10–5 || Onodera (3–5) || Hayashi (3–2) || Fujita (3) || 41,999 || 79–59–2
|-align="center" bgcolor="bbffbb"
| 141 || October 6 || Lions || 4–5 (12) || Tateyama (5–7) || Nishiguchi (4–4) ||  || 35,442 || 80–59–2
|-align="center" bgcolor="bbffbb"
| 142 || October 7 || Lions || 3–8 || Fujii (7–5) || Kimura (0–4) ||  || 17,623 || 81–59–2
|-align="center" bgcolor="ffbbbb"
| 143 || October 8 || @ Buffaloes || 1–11 || Kishida (10–4) || Yoshikawa (0–2) ||  || 15,297 || 81–60–2
|-align="center" bgcolor="bbffbb"
| 144 || October 10 || Eagles || 1–7 || M. Takeda (10–9) || Aoyama (3–5) ||  || 36,257 || 82–60–2
|-

Roster

Postseason

Climax Series

Stage 2

Game 1

Game 2

Game 3

Game 4

Japan Series

Game 1

Game 2

Game 3

Game 4

Game 5

Game 6

Awards
Various Fighters players won awards for their regular season performances. Five players were selected for the Best Nine Award: Yu Darvish, Shinji Takahashi, Kensuke Tanaka, Atsunori Inaba and Yoshio Itoi. Shinya Tsuruoka and Eiichi Koyano joined Best Nine winners Takahashi, Tanaka, Inaba and Itoi to take seven of the nine available PL Golden Glove Awards. Darvish was voted the PL Most Valuable Player as well as the PL Most Valuable Pitcher.

Player statistics

Batting

 Indicates PL leader in the category
Makoto Kaneko set a NPB record on April 14, 2009, by hitting at least one double in seven consecutive games.

Pitching 

 Indicates PL leader in the category

References

Hokkaido Nippon-Ham Fighters
Hokkaido Nippon-Ham Fighters seasons